The Lienchiang County Council (MTCC) is the elected county council of Lienchiang County, Republic of China. The council composes of nine councilors lastly elected through the 2018 Republic of China local election on 24 November 2018. It has the fewest seats among all councils in Taiwan.

History
MTCC was originally established as Lienchiang County Affairs Counseling Committee in 1957 by the Executive Yuan. On 7 November 1992, the martial law was lifted from Matsu and the committee was reformed into Lienchiang Temporary County Council and its councilor members were appointed by Fujian Provincial Government. The first election for the councilor members were done in January 1994, and in March 1994 it was finally changed and inaugurated to Lienchiang County Council. On 7 November 1996, the current council building in Fuxing Village of Nangan Township was completed.

Organization
 Speaker
 Deputy Speaker

Administrative departments
 Personnel Administrator
 Accountant
 Regulation
 Office of General Affairs
 Session Procedures
 Secretary

Sessions
 Examining Committee A
 Examining Committee B
 Discipline Committee
 Procedure Committee

Transportation
The council is accessible within walking distance from Matsu Nangan Airport.

See also
 Lienchiang County Government

References

1994 establishments in Taiwan
County councils of Taiwan
Matsu Islands